The New Frontier is an album by the American country music band Highway 101. Released in 1993, it was the band's only album on Liberty Records. Its only charting single was "You Baby You", which reached number 67 on the country music charts.

"No Chance to Dance" was previously recorded by Johnny Rodriguez in 1988 for his album "Gracias" and his version was released as a single reaching No. 72 on the charts in 1989. And it was also recorded in 1990 by Bob DiPiero, Dennis Robbins, and John Scott Sherrill (the writers of the song) when they formed the band Billy Hill, their version never made it on the charts.

Track listing 
 "You Baby You" (Chris McCarty, Gary Mallaber) – 3:22
 "Home on the Range" (Cactus Moser, Chuck Jones) – 2:59
 "Tell Me More" (Moser, Jones) – 2:46
 "No Chance to Dance" (Bob DiPiero, John Scott Sherrill, Dennis Robbins) – 3:08
 "Who's Gonna Love You" (Curtis Stone, Matraca Berg) – 3:37
 "The Last Frontier" (Moser, Jones) – 3:57
 "Fastest Healin' Broken Heart" (Curtis Stone, Pat Bunch) – 2:38
 "Love Walks" (Moser, Mike Noble, Jeff Pennig) – 4:01
 "You Are What You Do" (DiPiero, John Jarrard, Mark D. Sanders) – 2:59
 "I Wonder Where the Love Goes" (Moser, Jones) – 3:42

Personnel 
Highway 101
 Cactus Moser – drums, guitars, vocals
 Nikki Nelson – lead vocals, guitars
 Curtis Stone – bass guitar, mandolin, guitars, vocals
Additional musicians
 Michael Black – background vocals
 Larry Byrom – electric guitar
 Mark Casstevens – acoustic guitar, mandolin
 Larry Chaney – electric guitar
 Dan Dugmore – steel guitar
 Stuart Duncan – fiddle, mandolin
 Thom Flora – background vocals
 Paul Franklin – steel guitar
 Tony Harrell – keyboards
 Dann Huff – electric guitar
 John Jorgenson – electric guitar
 Steve Nathan – keyboards
 Mike Noble – acoustic guitar
 Harry Stinson – background vocals
Technical
 Derek Bason – recording assistant, mixing assistant
 Bob Campbell-Smith – additional recording
 Eric Elwell – additional recording
 Chuck Howard – producer
 John Kelton – recording (except for "Love Walks"), mixing
 Mel Jones – recording assistant
 Pat McMakin – recording ("Love Walks" only)
 Glenn Meadows – mastering
 Cactus Moser – producer
 Curtis Stone – producer

Singles

References 

1993 albums
Highway 101 albums
Liberty Records albums